The Place de Dublin is a square in the 8th arrondissement of Paris. According to the book Dictionnaire historique des rues de Paris by French historian Jacques Hillairet it was named after Dublin, the capital of the Republic of Ireland. It was notably depicted in French artist  Gustave Caillebotte's painting Paris Street; Rainy Day.

References

Streets in the 8th arrondissement of Paris